Lamar Jefferson Trotti (October 18, 1900 – August 28, 1952) was an American screenwriter, producer, and motion picture executive.

Early life and education 
Trotti was born in Atlanta, US. He became the first graduate of the Henry W. Grady College of Journalism and Mass Communication at the University of Georgia (UGA) in Athens, Georgia, when he received a Bachelor of Arts in Journalism (ABJ) in 1921. While at UGA, he was the editor of the independent student newspaper The Red and Black.

Professional career 
In the silent film era, he was a reporter for the daily Atlanta Georgian, where he interviewed many show business people, such as Viola Dana. Later, Trotti became an executive at Fox Film Corporation in 1933 and after its 1935 merger with Twentieth Century Pictures to become 20th Century Fox, he remained with the company until his death. He wrote about fifty films for the studio, producing many of them.  He only wrote one screenplay for another studio, You Can't Buy Everything (1934) for MGM.

He won an Academy Award for Writing Original Screenplay in 1944 for Wilson and was nominated for Young Mr. Lincoln (1939) and There's No Business Like Show Business (1952). He received the Laurel Award for Screenwriting Achievement, the lifetime achievement award of the WGA, in 1983.

Personal life
Trotti was in ill heath towards the end of his life and had taken six months leave from Fox when he died of a heart attack at hospital near his summer home in St Malo in Oceanside, California. He was survived by a widow, a son and a daughter. His eldest son had died in a car crash in 1950. Henry Koster later wrote that he thought Trotti died of "a broken heart" because of his son's death.

He is interred at Forest Lawn Memorial Park in Glendale, California.

Partial filmography 
 The Man Who Dared (1933) – writer (with Dudley Nichols)
Hold That Girl (1934) – writer (with Dudley Nichols)
Wild Gold (1934) – writer
Call It Luck (1934) – writer (with Dudley Nichols)
 Judge Priest (1934) – writer  (with Dudley Nichols) – directed by John Ford, with Will Rogers
Bachelor of Arts (1934) – writer
Life Begins at 40 (1934) – writer – with Will Rogers
Mr. Faintheart (1935) – writer 
 Steamboat Round the Bend (1935) – writer (with Dudley Nichols) – directed by John Ford, with Will Rogers
This Is the Life (1935) – writer – with Jane Withers
The First Baby (1936) – writer
 Gentle Julia (1936) – writer – with Jane Withers
The Country Beyond (1936) – writer
Pepper (1936) – writer – with Jane Withers
Ramona (1936) – writer – directed by Henry King
 Can This Be Dixie? (1936) – writer – with Jane Withers
Career Woman (1936) – writer
Time Out for Romance (1936) – writer
This Is My Affair (1937) – writer
Slave Ship (1937) – writer
Wife, Doctor and Nurse (1937) – writer – directed by Walter Lang
Second Honeymoon (1937) – writer – directed by Walter Lang
 In Old Chicago (1937) – writer – directed by Henry King
The Baroness and the Butler (1938) – writer – directed by Walter Lang
 Alexander's Ragtime Band (1938) – writer – directed by Henry King
 Gateway (1938) – writer
Kentucky (1938) – writer
The Story of Alexander Graham Bell (1939) – writer
 Young Mr. Lincoln (1939) – writer – directed by John Ford
Drums Along the Mohawk (1939) – writer – directed by John Ford
Brigham Young: Frontiersman (1940) – writer – directed by Henry Hathaway
Hudson's Bay (1941) – writer
Man Hunt (1941) – writer (with Dudley Nichols) – directed by Fritz Lang
Belle Starr (1941) – writer
To the Shores of Tripoli (1942) – writer
Tales of Manhattan (1942) – writer
Thunder Birds (1942) – writer, producer – directed by William Wellman
Immortal Sergeant (1942) – writer, producer
 The Ox-Bow Incident (1943) – writer, producer – directed by William Wellman
 Guadalcanal Diary (1943) – writer
 Wilson (1944) – writer – directed by Henry King
A Bell for Adano (1945) – writer, producer – directed by Henry King
 The Razor's Edge (1946) – writer
 Colonel Effingham's Raid (1946) – producer
 Mother Wore Tights (1947) – writer, producer – directed by Walter Lang
 Captain from Castile (1947) – writer, producer – directed by Henry King
The Walls of Jericho (1948) – writer, producer
 When My Baby Smiles at Me (1948) – writer
Yellow Sky (1948) – writer, producer – directed by William Wellman
You're My Everything (1949) – writer, producer – directed by Walter Lang
 Cheaper by the Dozen (1950) – writer, producer – directed by Walter Lang
 My Blue Heaven (1950) – writer – directed by Henry Koster
American Guerrilla in the Philippines (1950) – writer, producer – directed by Fritz Lang
I'd Climb the Highest Mountain (1951) – writer, producer – directed by Walter Lang
As Young as You Feel (1951) – writer, producer
 With a Song in My Heart (1952) – writer, producer – directed by Walter Lang
O. Henry's Full House (1952) – writer
 Stars and Stripes Forever (1952) – writer, producer – directed by Henry Koster
 There's No Business Like Show Business (1954) – writer – directed by Walter Lang

References

Other reading

External links

Lamar Trotti at TCMDB
Lamar Trotti at BFI

American male screenwriters
American film producers
Best Original Screenplay Academy Award winners
University of Georgia alumni
1900 births
1952 deaths
20th-century American businesspeople
Burials at Forest Lawn Memorial Park (Glendale)
20th-century American male writers
20th-century American screenwriters
Writers from Atlanta
Screenwriters from Georgia (U.S. state)